is a Japanese artist and photographer. He has appeared on the American television program Nightline and on News 11 on Japan's NHK.

Education
Itagaki received a B.A. in Studio Art from Tama Art University (Tokyo, Japan) in 1991 and an M.A. in Studio Art from New York University in 1995. He also studied at the International Center of Photography (ICP) in 1997.

Themes
Itagaki deals with social, religious and technological issues. He has been a pioneer in digital photography and started using digital alteration as early as 1994.

Career
Itagaki has made series of works called Tourists on the Moon, Honeymoon Wedding, Traveling Games, Cyber Amish County, Native American Reservation on the Moon and Urban Legends.

Selected exhibitions
 2005 Romo Gallery, Atlanta, GA
 2005 Tama Art University, Tokyo, Japan
 2004 Jack the Pelican Presents, New York City
 2004 K*MoPA, Kiyosato Museum of Photographic Arts, Japan
 2003 Odense Foto Triennial, Odense, Denmark
 2003 Byron Cohen Gallery, Kansas City, MO
 2002 Grand Arts, Kansas City, MO
 2000 Tyler Gallery, Temple University, Philadelphia
 2000 Cristinerose Gallery, New York City
 2000 The Alternative Museum, New York City
 1999 Grey Art Gallery, New York University, New York City

Museum collections
 Museet for Fotokunst, Odense, Denmark
 Gilman Foundation, New York City
 Kiyosato Museum of Photographic Arts, Japan

Awards
 1998 The Philip Morris Art Award Grand Prize, Japan
 1998 Pola Art Foundation Grant

Reviews
 "Yoshio Itagaki, a Japanese artist living in New York, portrays moonscapes of the future in his "Space Tourism" solo show of digital photos at Tyler Gallery. As he playfully sees it, scientific expeditions will have given way to hordes of tourists crowding the scene – an ethnic cross section of newlyweds, college students, children grimacing at the camera, and ordinary sightseers rather than heroic astronauts. Viewers are left to ponder the political and social implications of such conquest of outer space. One does not expect any special intelligence in work such as this. So all the more is our surprise on encountering Itagaki's challenge to us to consider what the future may bring. Besides, his chosen medium, photography, already had played a crucial role in space exploration. Seamlessly, then, he offers a continuing probe."
 "Through the miracle of digital technology, this Japanese-born New York artist produces photomontages depicting ordinary tourists on the moon, with the earth looming over the horizon in every case. In another series, tourists are inserted into video game scenes. Something about the disconnected rootlessness of modern life is implied."
 "We have to at least ask the question, "what if there is no life anywhere in the universe, except here, on earth?" If we are the only living creature anywhere, well, that means there is a lot of countries out there to visit, which inspired a photographer, Yoshio Itagaki to imagine the universe as one big tourist attraction. With every new planet, in every new star, there is a photo opportunity, smile! Because if we are alone, then the universe is one big empty vacation land..." narration from Brave New World series on ABC Network "Nightline" with Ted Koppel, 9/1999
 "Yoshio Itagaki makes us aware of a shift in public attitude toward space science and exploration that you might not have noticed, because it occurred gradually. Thirty years ago, space travel was still adventurous and even heroic. Now it's so routine that we hardly notice when a space shuttle takes off or lands. Space travel has been domesticated to the point that the danger and technological wizardry have become banal, if not invisible. Itagaki offers a composite photo that would have seemed fantastic a half-century ago – a Japanese wedding party posed on the moon, with earth rising in the background. We've seen the original picture of the site so many times that now it's just as amusing curiosity."
 "Yoshio Itagaki uses digital means to play on humorous stereotypes. Whether Japanese weddings, banished Native Americans or global tourists, Itagaki photographs images of people being photographed on the moon. The lunar backdrop and visible image of the Earth are incidental to those being photographed, reflecting humans essential egocentric nature."

References

External links
 Official website
 Art in Context reference page
 ARTNET.com reference page
 Grey Art Gallery NYU : Emerging Artists from Japan
 Jack the Perican Presents (Williamsburg, NYC) – Yoshio Itagaki Press Excerpts
 New York Times Review by Holland Cotter

Japanese painters
Japanese photographers
1967 births
Artists from Aichi Prefecture
Living people
Steinhardt School of Culture, Education, and Human Development alumni